Mala Vrbica is a village in the city area of Kragujevac, Serbia. According to the 2002 census, the village has a population of 203 people.

References

Populated places in Šumadija District